Aleksa Nikolić (born March 31, 1995), is a Serbian professional basketball player for Juventus of the Lietuvos krepšinio lyga. He played college basketball for the Marshall Thundering Herd.

College career 
Nikolić played for the Marshall Thundering Herd of the Conference USA (NCAA Division I) from 2014 to 2017. Nikolić appeared in all 32 games, including 25 starts in the 2014–15 season. He averaged 5.0 points, 4.1 rebounds and 3.5 assists per game during the regular season. In 2015–16 season, he appeared in the first two games of the year before suffering a season-ending injury at Morehead State on November 24, 2015, which required facial surgery. Nikolić appeared in all 25 games, including 3 starts in the 2016–17 season.

Professional career 
In September 2018, he joined FMP of the Basketball League of Serbia. In January 2019, he signed for Zlatibor.

References

External links

Player Profile at realgm.com
Player Profile at aba-liga.com

1995 births
Living people
ABA League players
Basketball League of Serbia players
BC Rakvere Tarvas players
BC Spartak Saint Petersburg players
KD Ilirija players
KK FMP players
KK Zlatibor players
KK Vojvodina players
Marshall Thundering Herd men's basketball players
Serbian expatriate basketball people in Austria
Serbian expatriate basketball people in Estonia
Serbian expatriate basketball people in Lithuania
Serbian expatriate basketball people in Slovenia
Serbian expatriate basketball people in Russia
Serbian expatriate basketball people in the United States
Serbian men's basketball players
Shooting guards